The AFCA Coach of the Year Award is given annually to college football coaches by the American Football Coaches Association (AFCA). Separate awards are presented at all levels of U.S. college football. The AFCA as a whole presents the award for the four divisions of NCAA football—Division I FBS, Division I FCS, Division II, and Division III—plus the NAIA. The AFCA's section for community and junior colleges presents an identical award to a head coach at a two-year institution. The award has had several different sponsors over the years, including Eastman Kodak Corporation, and thus also been named the Kodak Coach of the Year Award.

Winners

NCAA University Division / Division I-A/FBS

NCAA Division I-AA/FCS

NCAA College Division / Division II
This includes NCAA Division II and NAIA from 1983 to 2005.

NCAA Division III
This includes NCAA Division III and NAIA from 1983 to 1995.

NAIA
NAIA was included in the Division II and III groups until 2006 when it was broken into its own category.

Assistant Coach of the Year Award
The Assistant Coach of the Year Award is presented to a deserving assistant coach in each of the four NCAA football divisions and the NAIA. The award was created to honor assistant coaches who excel in community service, commitment to the student-athlete, on-field coaching success and AFCA and professional organization involvement.

References

College football coach of the year awards in the United States
Awards established in 1935
1935 establishments in the United States